

Incumbents
President: Zuzana Čaputová
Prime Minister: Igor Matovič

Events

Politics
29 February: 2020 Slovak parliamentary election
25 April: Juraj Hipš elected as new leader of SPOLU.
30 May: László Sólymos elected as new leader of Most–Híd.
6 June: Irena Bihariová elected as new leader of Progressive Slovakia.
10 June: Former Prime Minister Peter Pellegrini and several other members leave Smer–SD to found Hlas–SD.
20 July: Krisztián Forró elected as new leader of SMK, member party of MKÖ-MKS.
24 October: Coronavirus lockdown

Births

Deaths

References

 
2020s in Slovakia
Slovakia
Slovakia
Years of the 21st century in Slovakia